The seventh season of Indonesian Idol premiered on RCTI on February 17, 2012. The show aired every Friday at 8:00 pm and Re-run aired every Sunday at 1:00 pm. Daniel Mananta returned as the host, while Anang Hermansyah and Agnes Monica returned as the judges, and musician and hits-maker Ahmad Dhani replaced Erwin Gutawa as the third judges. Fabian Dharmawan became the new Executive Producer. Vokal Plus founder & CEO Indra Aziz, and Irvan Nat, both of them are professional vocal couches, became the new in-house mentors to work with the contestants on a weekly basis. Universal Music Indonesia replaced Sony Music Entertainment Indonesia as Idol's official partner record label. Cross Mobile, Coolant, Honda and Mie Sedaap, were the official sponsors of the show. This season followed the same format as American Idol season 11 and used the new title screen & logo with a different font started from Spectacular round.

Season 7 is the first season to have a finale with two female contestants, while the second and third seasons had a finale with two male contestants. It is the first season where a saved contestant, Kamasean Matthews to reach the finale. Regina Ivanova is the second contestants of all seasons had never been in the bottom 2 or 3 prior to the finale and the first to be the winner.

On July 8, 2012, Regina Ivanova became the winner of the seventh season of Indonesian Idol, beating Kamasean Matthews, the first female recipient of the judges' save.

The top two finalists from this season — Regina Ivanova and Kamasean Matthews — and 6th place finalist, Maria Rosalia a.k.a. Rosa Yoladetta were signed to record labels.

Judges 
The two official judges, Anang Hermansyah and Ahmad Dhani confirmed on early December 2011. There is some issues that says Agnes Monica will not return as judge due to her duty of her international career In Los Angeles, USA. But on 30 January 2012  Untung Pranoto, Operational Production Manager of RCTI announced all official judges, includes Agnes Monica.

Hedi Yunus, Nina Tamam and Andien were brought as guest judges during the auditions in Medan, Surabaya and Yogyakarta because Agnes Monica didn't appear those auditions. Piyu 'PADI', Audy and Meltho 'PASTO' are the guest judges for school audition in Palembang, Padang, Manado and Ambon. While Nina Tamam, Charly Van Houten, Hedi Yunus and Baron are the guest judges for bus audition.

In the beginning, many people were rumored to be in the running to join the judging panel, including Rossa, Sherina Munaf, Ello, Dewi Sandra, Rio Febrian and Tompi. Rio Febrian and Tompi have said (by their Twitter) that they would not be judges for this show, while Rossa said (by her Twitter) her schedule was busy and that it would probably be only as a guest judge on this season.

Selection process

Auditions

Regional auditions 
Auditions took place in the following cities:

 Requirement : Contestants must be 16–27 years old before 24 November 2011 and lives in Indonesia at least 5 years.

One auditioner who received widespread publicity was M. Ridho, also known as "Neng Neng Nong Neng", he auditioned with his original song titled "Ku Ingin Kita Lama Pacaran Disini". His catchy song was bought by Ahmad Dhani as 5 million rupiahs and he will get the royalty for 5 years.

Online audition 
Online audition is the new feature in seventh season. Audition was opened from  1–15 January 2012 and can be voted by viewers from YouTube until 23 January 2012. Contestant with the highest 'LIKE' automatically will through to judging in Jakarta.

Street auditions & School auditions 
Street audition held in city centers such as the mall, markets, station, town square and others. While the school auditions held in schools with the best musical talent in each city. Indonesia is first country in the world to do school auditions and these have now been picked up by Indian Idol.

Bus audition 
It's the third season of Indonesian Idol auditioned with the bus. Bus audition has gone to Malang, Madiun, Solo, Semarang, Tegal, Cirebon and Sukabumi.

Elimination round 
The Elimination rounds were held at Studio 4 RCTI Jakarta starting 7 February 2012. There were 109 contestants at the start of Elimination round (one of them was disqualified because didn't attend the judging). The contestants performed solo for the first round, and 52 advanced to the next round, where the contestants performed in groups. The contestants were then separated into five rooms, with two room of contestants being eliminated and one room of contestants that must perform again in front of judges. The remaining 27 contestants made it through to the final "Sing For Your Life" round. In that round, each contestant performed a song of their own choosing. Only 15 contestants made it through to the Top 15.

Semi-finalists 
After the 27 remaining contestants sang their final solo in the Sing For Your Life round, they were called one by one to hear the final judgement. The semi-finalists were announced in the 30 March episode, with the top fifteen being revealed at the episode’s end. Due to personal reasons, Henriyanto, one of Top 15 chosen, withdrew from the competition and was replaced by previously eliminated contestant Kanza Dinar.

Top 15 show 
The Top 15 Show was aired LIVE on 6 April at 8:30 pm. Below are the contestants listed in their performance order. The top five viewers' choice and top five judges' choice advanced to the Spectacular. There were fifteen semifinalists, nine females and six males. The contestants perform songs of their choice (there was no particular theme).

Wild Card round 
At the end of the episode revealing the top ten, it was announced that the judges (except Anang Hermansyah) wanted to add two more finalists in Spectacular. The five possibilities were Ni Putu Karina, Intania Ayu, Febri Yoga, Maria Rosalia and Shandy Eugene. After the judges discussed, it was announced that Febri Yoga and Maria Rosalia were the top twelve finalists.

Finalists 
 Regina Ivanova Polapa (born December 4, 1985) is from Jakarta, Jakarta Special Capital Region and was 26 years old at the time of the show. She had auditioned for Idol 6 times before and never made it through. She auditioned in Jakarta with Adele's "One and Only". She is the sister of Topodade personnel, Mia Sani who won the DreamGirls Indonesia in 2009. She was the oldest contestant to reach the Spectacular and Finale. Her musical influences are Adele and Beyoncé Knowles. She is the second contestants of all seasons that had never been in the bottom 2 or 3 prior to the finale. Regina was announced as the winner on 7 July 2012.
 Kamasean Yoce Matthews (born June 30, 1995) is from Bekasi, West Java and was 16 years old at the time of the show. She auditioned in Bandung with Agnes Monica's "Cinta Mati". She had competed on season 3 of Akademi Fantasi Indosiar Junior, and made it to the ninth place. She was the youngest contestant to reach the Spectacular and Finale. Her musical influence is Alicia Keys. She was saved from elimination by the judges after receiving the lowest number of votes in the top five round, making her the first female contestant to be saved by the judges. Kamasean was announced as the runner-up on 7 July 2012.
 Prattyoda Bhayangkara (born February 9, 1987) is from Kebumen and was 25 years old at the time of the show. He auditioned in Jakarta with Bad English's "When I See You Smile". He is the vocalist of the Today band. He was eliminated on 23 June 2012 and came in 3rd place.
 Dionisius Agung Subagyo (born April 30, 1986) is from Purwokerto, Central Java and was 25 years old at the time of the show. He was born in Temanggung. He auditioned in Jakarta with "Tanjung Perak" in the jazz version. He impressed the judges with his performance of "Tanjung Perak" in his final solo Sing For Your Life round. He was eliminated on 16 June 2012 and came in 4th place.
 Febri Yoga Sapta Rahardjo (born February 28, 1988) is from Tegal, Central Java and was 23 years old at the time of the show. He auditioned in Bus Audition Tegal with Krisdayanti's "Menghitung Hari". Febri was chosen by Agnes Monica as one of the Wild Cards to join the Top 12 finalists. His musical influence is Matthew Bellamy from Muse which his vocal is similar to. He was eliminated on 9 June 2012 and came in 5th place.
 Maria Rosalia Yola Detta (born October 31, 1991) is from Solo, Central Java and was 20 years old at the time of the show. She auditioned in Yogyakarta with Kotak's "Pelan-Pelan Saja". She competed on Suara Indonesia, making it to the finale and placed as first runner-up. Maria was chosen by Ahmad Dhani as one of the Wild Cards to join the Top 12 finalists. She was eliminated on 25 May 2012 and came in 6th place.
 Non Dera Anggia Putri Prawitasari (born December 2, 1993) is from Sukabumi, West Java and was 18 years old at the time of the show. She was born in Cianjur. She auditioned in Bus Audition Sukabumi with Dewa 19's "Cemburu". She was eliminated on 18 May 2012 and came in 7th place.
 Rosandy Sriwidia Nugroho (born August 6, 1986) is from Jakarta, Jakarta Special Capital Region and was 25 years old at the time of the show. He was born in Solo. He auditioned in Jakarta with David Cook's cover song "Always Be My Baby". He used to be vocalist of the Putih band. He was eliminated on 11 May 2012 and came in 8th place.
 Rio Agung Pangestu Hamdan (born July 19, 1994) is from Sumedang, West Java and was 17 years old at the time of the show. He auditioned in Bandung with Ruth Sahanaya's "Ingin Ku Miliki". He impressed the judges with his great voice in the audition room, although his first look wasn't convincing the judges. He was eliminated on 4 May 2012 and came in 9th place.
 Ivan Saputra (born July 12, 1988) is from Jakarta, Jakarta Special Capital Region and was 23 years old at the time of the show. He auditioned in Jakarta with Adera's "Lebih Indah". He was eliminated on 27 April 2012 and came in 10th place.
 Belinda Hanrisna Fueza (born March 7, 1992) is from Bekasi, West Java and was 20 years old at the time of the show. She auditioned in Jakarta. She competed on season 3 of Mamamia, making it to the quarterfinals. Belinda's only appearance in season 7 was during the green mile round. She sang "Selalu Cinta" by Kotak for the Sing for Your Life round and she impressed the judges. She was eliminated on 20 April 2012 and came in 11th place. Her musical influence is Demi Lovato.
 Kanza Dinar Adibah (born June 19, 1994) is from Jakarta, Jakarta Special Capital Region and was 17 years old at the time of the show. She auditioned in Jakarta with Bebi Romeo's "Aku Cinta Kau dan Dia". She was cut in the green mile round, but she was called back by judges to replace Henriyanto, who withdrew from the competition. She was eliminated on 13 April 2012 and came in 12th place.

Spectacular show 
This is the fifth season in which there are 10 weeks of the Spectacular and 12 finalists, with one of the 12 finalists eliminated each week. The Andra & The Backbone's "Selamat Tinggal Masa Lalu" became the send-off song played when a contestant is eliminated.

Top 12 – The Star is Born

Top 11 – The Biggest Band

Top 10 – Songs of Dedication

Top 9 – Tribute to Judges / Boy & Girl band Indonesia 
 Guest mentor: Agnes Monica

Top 8 – The Power of Love / Duets 

Guest judges: Melly Goeslaw

Agnes Monica did not appear on the judging panel for week 5 due to her international album project in Los Angeles, so Melly Goeslaw took her place on the panel. Agnes still judging via Skype from Los Angeles.

Top 7 – Viewers' Choice 
Guest judges: Dimas Djayadiningrat
Agnes Monica did not appear on the judging panel for week 6 due to her international album project in Los Angeles, so Dimas Djayadiningrat, season 1-3 judge, took her place on the panel.

Group performance: "Jomblowati" (SHE) / "PUSPA" (ST 12) / "Lelaki Buaya Darat" (Ratu) / "Naluri Lelaki" (Samsons) / "Perempuan Paling Cantik di Negeriku Indonesia (T.R.I.A.D) / "Racun Dunia" (The Changcuters) / "Cari Pacar Lagi" (ST 12)

Top 6 – Dhani's Choice 

Guest mentor: Ahmad Dhani
Guest judges: Jaclyn Victor

Each contestant performed two songs. 
Agnes Monica did not appear on the judging panel for week 7 due to her international album project in Los Angeles, so Jaclyn Victor, winner of first season Malaysian Idol, took her place on the panel.

Top 5 (first week) – The Lucky Songs

Top 5 (second week) – Favorite & Dream Songs 
Start on spectacular 9, the show aired Saturday. Spectacular 9 held on 18:00, due to be aired at 22:300 on UEFA Euro 2012 match between Netherlands and Denmark.

Top 4 – Solo & Duet

Top 3 – Indonesian Hits / International Hits / Tribute to Chrisye

Top 2 – Judge's Challenge / Disney's Duet / Tribute to Vina Panduwinata / Winning Song

Elimination chart 

 Due to the judges using their one 'Judges' Save' per season, in order to save Kamasean, the 'Top 5' remained intact for another week. 
 It was only announced that Dionisius Agung received the lowest number of votes this week. The other member(s) of bottom two or three were never revealed, and safe contestants were announced in random order.

Results show performances

Indonesia Nielsen ratings 
The premiere was watched by 18.9 million viewers. It was up 10 percent from the previous year's premiere, which was watched by 17.7 million viewers.  Season 7 of Indonesian Idol is the most successful series in the history of Indonesian Idol.

Begin this episode, the show airs at 8:30 PM
Begin this episode, the show airs at 8:00 PM
Begin this episode, the show airs every Saturday. Especially for this episode, the show airs at 6:00 PM due to UEFA Euro 2012 match Netherlands and Denmark.

Controversies

Hendriyanto's Exit 
Top 15 contestant Hendriyanto decided to withdraw from Indonesian Idol because he was not ready to leave his family in Brastagi.

Apkasi's 350 Million Prizes 
Asosiasi Pemerintah Kabupaten Seluruh Indonesia (Apkasi) or Indonesian Regency Administration Association has given a total Rp 350 million ($36.8 thousand) to Top 5 Indonesian Idol, but it made public controversy why Apkasi support Indonesian Idol whom is foreign franchise with profit oriented and not support local culture interests.

Southeast Asia television rights 

Notes:
 Republic of Singapore was delayed telecasts in 2012 Indonesian reality television singing competition Indonesian Idol with Indonesian dubbing and English subtitles.

See also 
 Indonesian Idol
 Indonesian Idol (Season 1)
 Indonesian Idol (Season 2)
 Indonesian Idol (Season 3)
 Indonesian Idol (Season 4)
 Indonesian Idol (Season 5)
 Indonesian Idol (Season 6)

References

External links 
 Official Site 

Indonesian Idol
2012 Indonesian television seasons